Archaeological Museum of Naxos is a museum in Naxos Greece.

This newly declared historical monument is located in a Venetian building, built some time between 1600 and 1800 for the Jesuit school established in 1700, later becoming the Archaeological Museum in 1972.

The museum houses finds from the Early Cycladic period including figurines from Naxos itself, Kato Kouphonisi and Keros, from the Late Mycenaean period including stirrup jars and other grave goods from chamber tombs and other graves from the Kamini mound and Aplomata. A smaller area is given over to finds from the Geometric Period and later finds, including sculpture from all periods of Naxos' history.

With effect from 07 January 2019, it is open from 08.00 to 15.30 daily, except Tuesdays.

References

External links
www.naxosnet.com
Hellenic Ministry of Culture and Tourism
Hellenic Ministry of Foreign Affairs
www.planetware.com

Naxos
Museums established in 1972
Buildings and structures in Naxos
1972 establishments in Greece